The Midland was a regional little magazine which was published between 1915 and 1933 in the United States. Its subtitle was A Magazine of the Middle West between its start in 1915 and 1929. Then it was changed as A National Literary Magazine which was used until its closure in 1933. It was the most significant regional little magazine of the period.

History and profile
The Midland was launched in 1915, and the first issue appeared in January that year. Its publisher was John Springer from Economy Advertising Company. John T. Frederick was both the founder and the sole editor of the magazine which featured essays and fiction written by local authors. From 1925 to 1930 Frank Luther Mott served as its coeditor. The magazine was instrumental in making the Midland literary work independent of the influence of the Eastern states.

During its lifetime the frequency of The Midland was changed several times: monthly (1915–1917; 1923–1927), bimonthly (1918–1919; 1928–1933) and monthly and bimonthly (1920–1922). The magazine was launched in Iowa City, but in 1917 its headquarters moved to Moorhead, Minnesota. From 1919 to 1921 it was published in Glennie, Missouri, and from 1922 to 1923 its headquarters was in Pittsburgh. Then The Midland was based in Chicago. The magazine ceased publication with the issue dated May-June 1933. In November 1933 it merged with Frontier to establish Frontier and Midland magazine.

References

1915 establishments in Iowa
1933 disestablishments in Illinois
Bimonthly magazines published in the United States
Defunct literary magazines published in the United States
Magazines established in 1915
Magazines disestablished in 1933
Magazines published in Chicago
Magazines published in Iowa
Monthly magazines published in the United States
Magazines published in Missouri
Magazines published in Minnesota
Magazines published in Pittsburgh